The following is a list of Philippine television ratings for 2009 coming from AGB Nielsen Philippines (AGB) and Taylor Nelson Sofres (TNS).

For AGB Nielsen, Mega Manila accounts for about 48% of total TV households in urban Philippines. The Mega Manila and Luzon markets combined account for about 67% of the total TV households in urban Philippines. Non-urban households aren't included in both Mega Manila and NUTAM surveys. For TNS, Mega Manila comprises about 56% of national households.

Markets

Note that the National Urban Television Audience Measurement (NUTAM) does not represent the entire Philippines but only urban areas; NUTAM markets comprise 39% of the entire country. The Mega Manila market comprises 55% of the NUTAM market.

National Urban Television Audience Measurement
Monthly NUTAM ratings from AGB will be available after January.

Weekly TNS ratings
No ratings data for the Philippines were published prior to February 13.

Mega Manila

Weekly AGB ratings
No ratings data were released on January 1–4.

References

External links
AGB Nielsen corporate website
AGB-NMR Philippines official website (NUTAM)
TNS Philippines
 Philippine Entertainment Portal - TV section

Ratings 2009
Ratings 2009
Ratings 2009